Gros-Morne is a town and commune in the French overseas department of Martinique, and one of the least-developed on the island.

Population

See also
Communes of the Martinique department

References

External links

Communes of Martinique
Populated places in Martinique